On a Day: Music for Violin & Continuo (commonly referred to as: On a Day...) is the debut instrumental album by Emilie Autumn, released in 1997. The album was recorded the same year, when Autumn was seventeen years old. Its title refers to both the Shakespeare song and the fact that the album took only a day to record. It consists of her performing works for the baroque violin accompanied by friends on the cello, harpsichord, and lute.

Release and promotion
On a Day... was originally released by Emilie Autumn on her own record label, Traitor Records. Autumn did not initially intend to release the album, considering it "more of a demo despite its length", and released it after fans who enjoyed her "rock performances starting asking for a classical album so that they could hear more of the violin".

The album was re-released digitally by Trisol Music Group in 2005.

The album was again re-released as "Laced" on Emilie's second instrumental album Laced / Unlaced in 2007.

Track listing

Personnel
 Emilie Autumn – baroque violin
 Roger Lebow – baroque cello
 Michael Egan – lute
 Edward Murray – harpsichord

References

External links
Official website

1997 debut albums
Emilie Autumn albums